"For What It's Worth" is a 1966 Stephen Stills / Buffalo Springfield song; it may also refer to:

Music
For What It's Worth (EP) by Ensign
For What It's Worth (album) by Stick to Your Guns
"For What It's Worth" (The Cardigans song)
"For What It's Worth" (Placebo song)
"For What It's Worth" (Stevie Nicks song)
"For What It's Worth", song by Liam Gallagher from As You Were

Other
For What It's Worth (novel), a novel by Janet Tashjian
For What It's Worth, a stand-up comedy special by Dave Chappelle
For What It's Worth (game show), a 2016 BBC daytime antiques game show
Paul Harvey's For What It's Worth, a book compiling radio segments by Paul Harvey